Harrisia is a genus of tachinid fly containing two species.

Harrisia brasiliensis Robineau-Desvoidy, 1830
Harrisia scutellaris Robineau-Desvoidy, 1830

References

Tachinidae